The Nottingham Civic Society is a civic society based in the city of Nottingham, England.

The society was founded in 1962 and aims to care for the city of Nottingham, especially with respect to its historic buildings and heritage. Meetings are held at Nottingham Mechanics, North Sherwood Street, previously at St Barnabas Cathedral Hall.

See also 
 Civic Trust

References

External links 
 Nottingham Civic Society website

1962 establishments in England
Charities based in Nottinghamshire
Clubs and societies in Nottinghamshire
Culture in Nottingham
Heritage organisations in England
Historical societies of the United Kingdom
History of Nottingham
Organisations based in Nottingham
Organizations established in 1962
Civic societies in the United Kingdom